Euryale ferox, commonly known as prickly waterlily,  makhana or Gorgon plant, is a species of water lily found in southern and eastern Asia, and the only extant member of the genus Euryale. The edible seeds, called fox nuts or makhana when dried, are eaten in Asia.

Though normally classified in the water lily family, Nymphaeaceae, the species is occasionally regarded as a distinct family, Euryalaceae. Unlike other water lilies, the pollen grains of Euryale have three nuclei.

Etymology
The genus is named after a mythical Greek Gorgon, Euryale.

The specific name forax is Latin for wild.

Growth

Euryale ferox is a perennial plant native to eastern Asia and southern Asia, and is found from northeast India to Korea and Japan, as well as parts of eastern Russia. The Indian state of Bihar produces 90% of the world's fox nuts.  It grows in water, producing bright purple flowers.  The leaves are large and round, often more than a meter (3 feet) across, with a leaf stalk attached in the centre of the lower surface.  The underside of the leaf is purplish, while the upper surface is green.  The leaves have a quilted texture, although the stems, flowers, and leaves which float on the surface are covered in sharp prickles. Other leaves are submerged. In India, Euryale normally grows in ponds and wetlands.

Uses

Culinary

The plant produces starchy white seeds that are edible.  The plant is cultivated for its seeds in lowland ponds in India, China, and Japan.  The Chinese have cultivated the plant for centuries. More than 96,000 hectares of Bihar, India, were set aside for cultivation of Euryale in 1990–1991. The plant grows best in locations with hot, dry summers and cold winters. Seeds are collected in the late summer and early autumn, and may be eaten raw or cooked.

In the northern and western parts of India, Euryale ferox seeds are often roasted or fried, which causes them to pop like popcorn. These are then eaten, often with a sprinkling of oil and spices. They are also used in other types of cooking, especially to make a porridge or pudding called kheer.

Evidence from archaeobotany indicates that Euryale ferox was a frequently collected wild food source during the Neolithic period in the Yangtze region, with large numbers of finds coming from the sites of Kuahuqiao, Hemudu, and Tianluoshan. The earliest recorded use of E. ferox was found in Gesher Benot Ya'aqov, Israel, among artifacts of the Acheulean culture 750–790,000 years ago.

The seeds are used in Cantonese soup.

Traditional medicine
The seeds of foxnut are used in Ayurveda preparations and in traditional Chinese medicine.

Notes

References

Further reading

External links

Flora of Korea
Medicinal plants of Asia
Nymphaeaceae
Plants described in 1805
Plants used in traditional Chinese medicine
Taxa named by Richard Anthony Salisbury